The 1944 Irish general election to the 12th Dáil was held on Tuesday, 30 May, having been called on 9 May by President Douglas Hyde on the advice of Taoiseach Éamon de Valera. The general election took place in 34 parliamentary constituencies for 138 seats in Dáil Éireann, the house of representatives of the Oireachtas. Fianna Fáil won an overall majority. The outgoing 11th Dáil was dissolved on 7 June.

The 12th Dáil met at Leinster House on 9 June to nominate the Taoiseach for appointment by the president and to approve the appointment of a new government of Ireland on the nomination of the Taoiseach. Outgoing Taoiseach Éamon de Valera was re-appointed leading a single-party Fianna Fáil government.

Calling the election
The outgoing Fianna Fáil government, formed on 1 July 1943, was a minority government. On 9 July 1944, it suffered a defeat for the second reading of its Transport Bill. Taoiseach Éamon de Valera sought a snap election, just one year after the previous election, in hopes of getting an overall majority.

It was the second election called under the General Elections (Emergency Provisions) Act 1943. The Act, intended to increase national security by minimising the interval during which no Dáil is in existence, subvented the requirement under the Constitution for the president to dissolve the Dáil before a general election took place, and was permitted under the state of emergency in effect during the Second World War. The election was called on 9 May but the Dáil met as scheduled on the following day, when an adjournment debate was held in which the opposition TDs condemned the decision to hold an election in wartime as unnecessary and reckless. The 11th Dáil was dissolved on 7 June 1944.

Campaign
The campaign was not wanted by the opposition parties. Fianna Fáil fought the election on its record in government and also in the hope of securing a fresh mandate for its policies. During the campaign Fine Gael put forward the proposal of forming a coalition government with the Labour Party and Clann na Talmhan; however, this was ridiculed by Fianna Fáil as untenable. National Labour had split from Labour in January 1944.

Due to the fractured nature of the opposition, Éamon de Valera's tactic of calling a snap general election succeeded, with Fianna Fáil increasing its share of seats, as it had in the previous snap elections of 1933 and 1938.

Result

|}

Voting summary

Seats summary

Government formation
Fianna Fáil formed the 4th Government of Ireland, a majority government.

First-time TDs
Thomas Brennan
Harry Colley
Eamonn Coogan
Walter Furlong
Michael Lydon
Patrick McAuliffe
John S. O'Connor
Mary Ryan

Re-elected TDs
John A. Costello
Frank Loughman
Peter O'Loghlen
Eamonn O'Neill
Laurence Walsh
Richard Walsh (regained seat)

Outgoing TDs
Ernest Benson (lost seat)
W. T. Cosgrave (retired)
John Esmonde (lost seat)
James Larkin (lost seat)
Timothy Linehan (lost seat)
Jeremiah Ryan (retired)
Richard Stapleton (lost seat)

See also
5th Seanad

Notes

References

Sources

1944 elections in Europe
General election, 1944
1944
12th Dáil
May 1944 events
General election